Pseudarthria is a genus of flowering plants in the  family Fabaceae. It belongs to the subfamily Faboideae, and contains some 6 species:

 Pseudarthria confertiflora (A.Rich.) Baker
 Pseudarthria crenata Hiern
 Pseudarthria fagifolia Baker
 Pseudarthria hookeri Wight & Arn.
 Pseudarthria macrophylla Baker
 Pseudarthria viscida (L.) Wight & Arn.

References

Desmodieae
Fabaceae genera